The Thurber Prize for American Humor, named after American humorist James Thurber, recognizes outstanding contributions in humor writing.  The prize is given out by the Thurber House. It was first awarded irregularly, but since 2004 has been bestowed annually. In 2015, the finalists were for the first time, all women. Winners of the Thurber Prize have included authors from an array of diverse backgrounds, from The Daily Show hosts Jon Stewart and Trevor Noah to The New Yorker staff writers Calvin Trillin and Ian Frazier, as well as university professors Julie Schumacher and Harrison Scott Key.

Award winners
1997: Ian Frazier (winner) — Coyote v. Acme
Al Franken (finalist) — Rush Limbaugh is a Big Fat Idiot and Other Observations
David Sedaris (finalist) — Naked
1999: The Onion editorial staff (winner) — Our Dumb Century
2001: David Sedaris (winner) — Me Talk Pretty One Day
Henry Alford (Special Honor Book) — Big Kiss
Andy Borowitz (finalist) — The Trillionaire Next Door
Bill Bryson (finalist) — In a Sunburned Country
Brett Leveridge (finalist) — Men My Mother Dated
Jim Mullen (finalist) — It Takes a Village Idiot
2004: Christopher Buckley (winner) — No Way to Treat a First Lady
Robert Kaplow (finalist) — Me and Orson Welles
Dan Zevin (finalist) — The Day I Turned Uncool
2005: Jon Stewart, Ben Karlin, David Javerbaum and the writing staff of The Daily Show (winner) — America (The Book)
Andy Borowitz (finalist) — The Borowitz Report: The Big Book of Shockers
Firoozeh Dumas (finalist) — Funny in Farsi
2006: Alan Zweibel (winner) — The Other Shulma
Kinky Friedman (finalist) — Texas Hold 'Em: How I Was Born in a Manger, Died in the Saddle, and Came Back as a Horny Toad
Bill Scheft (finalist) — Time Won't Let Me
2007: Joe Keenan (winner) — My Lucky Star
Merrill Markoe (finalist) — Walking In Circles Before Lying Down
Bob Newhart (finalist) — I Shouldn't Even Be Doing This!: And Other Things That Strike Me As Funny
2008: Larry Doyle (winner) — I Love You Beth Cooper
Patricia Marx (finalist) — Him Her Him Again The End of Him
Simon Rich (finalist) — Ant Farm: And Other Desperate Situations
2009: Ian Frazier (winner) — Lamentations of the Father
Sloane Crosley (finalist) — I Was Told There'd Be Cake
Bruce Ducker (finalist) Dizzying Heights: The Aspen Novel
Don Lee (finalist) — Wrack and Ruin
Laurie Notaro (finalist) — The Idiot Girl and the Flaming Tantrum of Death
2010: Steve Hely (winner) — How I Became a Famous Novelist
Jancee Dunn (finalist) — Why Is My Mother Getting a Tattoo?
Rhoda Janzen (finalist) — Mennonite in a Little Black Dress
2011: David Rakoff (winner) — Half Empty
Mike Birbiglia (finalist) — Sleepwalk With Me and Other Painfully True Stories
Rick Reilly (finalist) — Sports from Hell
2012: Calvin Trillin (winner) — Quite Enough of Calvin Trillin: Forty Years of Funny Stuff
Nate DiMeo (finalist) — Pawnee
Patricia Marx (finalist) — Starting from Happy
2013: Dan Zevin (winner) — Dan Gets a Minivan
Shalom Auslander (finalist) — Hope: A Tragedy
Dave Barry and Alan Zweibel (finalists) — Lunatics: A Novel
2014: John Kenney (winner) — Truth In Advertising
 Liza Donnelly (finalist) — Women on Men
 Bruce McCall and David Letterman (finalists) — This Land Was Made for You and Me (But Mostly Me)
2015: Julie Schumacher (winner) — Dear Committee Members
Roz Chast (finalist) — Can't We Talk About Something More Pleasant?
Annabelle Gurwitch (finalist) — I See You Made an Effort: Compliments, Indignities, and Survival Stories from the Edge of 50
2016: Harrison Scott Key (winner) — The World's Largest Man
Jason Gay (finalist) — Little Victories
Mary Norris (finalist) — Between You & Me: Confessions of a Comma Queen.
2017: Trevor Noah (winner) – Born a Crime
Ken Pisani – Amp'd
Aaron Thier – Mr. Eternity

2018: Patricia Lockwood (winner) – Priestdaddy
Jenny Allen (finalist) – Would Everybody Please Stop?
John Hodgman (finalist) – Vacationland: True Stories from Painful Beaches

2019: Simon Rich (winner) - Hits and Misses
Sloane Crosley (finalist) – Look Alive Out There
John Kenney (finalist) – Love Poems for Married People

2020: Damon Young (winner) - What Doesn't Kill You Makes You Blacker
Dave Barry (finalist) – Lessons from Lucy
Kira Jane Buxton (finalist) – Hollow Kingdom
2021: James McBride (winner) — Deacon King Kong
Alexandra Petri (finalist) — Nothing Is Wrong and Here Is Why
Mike Birbiglia (finalist) — The New One: Painfully True Stories from a Reluctant Dad

References

External links
 Thurber Prize for American Humor at Thurber House

American literary awards
Awards established in 1997
Comedy and humor literary awards
American comedy and humor awards
1997 establishments in Ohio